Mark Barry (born 13 May 1964) is a British former cyclist.

Cycling career
He competed in the sprint and 1000m time trial events at the 1984 Summer Olympics.

He represented England in the match sprint and time trial events, at the 1982 Commonwealth Games in Brisbane, Queensland, Australia.

Barry was twice British track champion, winning the British National Individual Sprint Championships in 1982 and 1983.

References

External links
 

1964 births
Living people
English male cyclists
Olympic cyclists of Great Britain
Cyclists at the 1984 Summer Olympics
Cyclists at the 1982 Commonwealth Games
Sportspeople from Leeds
Commonwealth Games competitors for England
20th-century British people